The siege of Saati was the first battle of the Italo-Ethiopian War of 1887–1889 between Italian colonial forces and Ethiopian forces.

Background

In 1885 Italy occupied the Eritrean port of Massawa, then in Egyptian hands, and made it a base for a subsequent inland expansion. Inevitably, Italian interests clashed with those of the neighboring Ethiopian Empire which for some time had aimed at an outlet on the Red Sea. However, unlike other European powers, Italy undertook a very slow process of penetration into the Eritrean hinterland. In fact, the town of Saati, 28 km from Massawa, was occupied by two companies commanded by Major Giovanni Boretti supported by 300 Bashi-bazouk, only on January 14 1887. Then, the Italians entrenched themselves on a hill and built a small fort on it. Four days later Ras Alula wrote to Boretti asking that the men in Saati abandon their positions. On January 24, about 20,000 Ethiopians under Ras Alula's command camped 5 km from the fort of Saati.

The Battle
At dawn on January 25, a patrol led by Lieutenant Federico Cuomo, from Messina, was sent on reconnaissance towards the Ethiopian camp, but were surprised attacked and the Italians were forced to take refuge in the fort after a violent firefight. In the meantime Boretti became aware of an Ethiopian attempt to circumvent the Italian positions and thus began to bomb the enemy troops below.

Towards noon another patrol saw other Abyssinian troops who, having seen themselves uncovered, attacked the fort in large numbers. When the enemies reached 300 meters from the fort, the Italians opened fire. The attack lasted about four hours, after which the Ethiopians withdrew due to heavy losses.

Italian Order of Battle
9th company of the 6th Infantry Regiment
10th company of the 7th Infantry Regiment
A section of the 1st Company of the 17th Artillery Rgt
6 buluc of Bashi-bazouk

Aftermath
The battle caused the Italians 2 dead (one of them was Lieutenant Cuomo) and 2 wounded, among the Basci-bazouk 3 dead, 1 wounded and 5 missing. That same evening Boretti sent a message to the Moncullo garrison in which he urgently asked for reinforcements, ammunition and provisions. From Moncullo on the morning of January 26 the column led by Lieutenant Colonel Tommaso De Cristoforis left to rescue Boretti and was attacked and destroyed by the troops of Ras Alula near Dogali.

Given the desperate situation, Major Boretti had no choice but to abandon the fort of Saati, which he did on the evening of January 27, arriving in Moncullo at dawn the following day, without being sighted by the enemy troops. Saati was then permanently occupied by the Italians in March 1887.

References

Bibliography
Camillo Antona-Traversi, Sahati and Dogali: 25 and 26 January 1887, Rome, Pallotta Brothers Typography, 1887.
Bahru Zewde, A History of Modern Ethiopia - from 1855 to 1974, Eastern African Studies, (2nd ed. 1999), London, 1991, page 244
Haggai Erlich, Ras Alula and the cramble for Africa - A political biography: Ethiopia & Eritrea 1875-1897, First Red Sea Press, Lawrenceville (NJ), Asmara, 1996, 223 p.
Emilio Faldella, Storia degli eserciti italiani, Bramante editrice, 1976.
Guy Goddefroid, “L'Italie et l'Éthiopie”, review Vae Victis the themes, Issue no. 4, Winter 2008
Harold G. Marcus, The Life and Times of Menelik II: Ethiopia 1844-1913, Oxford, Clarendon Press, 1975, page 298
Raphaël Schneider, “Adoua, 1896”, Champs de Bataille review, issue no. 24, October-November 2008

Conflicts in 1887
1887 in Ethiopia
1887 in Italy
Battles involving Ethiopia
Battles involving Italy
Ethiopia–Italy military relations